Outlook is a radio programme on BBC World Service that broadcasts human interest stories from across the globe. It broadcasts from Monday to Thursday from 1206 to 1259 GMT. A shorter edition, Outlook Weekend, airs on Saturdays from 2332 to 2359 GMT.

History
This programme was first broadcast on 4 July 1966 by BBC. It began as a straightforward magazine programme and was presented for more than thirty years by John Tidmarsh. More recently, it has been praised for a consistent ability to uncover fascinating stories. It was credited with bringing solace to Terry Waite after his abduction by Islamic extremists in Beirut in 1987.

Corruption of any kind is a favourite topic on the show and it has achieved recognition for its high production values alongside other BBC radio programmes.

Presenters
The first presenters were former BBC war correspondent Bob Reid, John Tidmarsh and Colin Hamilton. Other regular presenters have included John McCarthy, Barbara Myers, John Waite, Mike Bullen, Janet Trewin, Frank Partridge, Caroline Wyatt, Frederick Dove (between 1997 and 2008), Heather Payton, George Arney, Lucy Ash, Rajan Datar and Matthew Bannister (between 2008 and 2018). It is currently presented by Jo Fidgen and Emily Webb from BBC Broadcasting House in London.

In June 2020, Abdulmalik Fahd and Helen Oyibo were listed as presenters based in Lagos, Nigeria.

Past theme music
Throughout the 1970s and 1980s its theme music was "The Hellraisers" by Syd Dale.

References

External links 
 BBC Outlook

BBC World Service programmes
BBC news radio programmes